Uri Gordon may refer to:

 Uri Gordon (anarchist) (born 1976), Israeli anarchist
 Uri Gordon (Zionist) (1935–2000), Israeli Zionist